Charles Danvers was a soldier, plotter and MP.

Charles Danvers may also refer to:

Charles Danvers (MP for Ludgershall)
Charles Danvers (songwriter)